The Ontario Soccer League (OSL) is a competitive amateur soccer league in Ontario, Canada. The OSL is affiliated with and governed by the Ontario Soccer Association. According to the OSA, the OSL has Provincial Leagues, Regional Leagues and Multi-Jurisdictional Leagues.

The league is divided into 12 regional divisions. It can be considered part of Canada's fifth tier in soccer, with teams eligible to compete for the Challenge Trophy.

Regions
For the 2022 season, the Ontario Soccer League is divided into two regional leagues: West and East.

Teams
The following teams are taking part in the 2022 season:

Champions

 2006 Sora Sun Devils (east) & Wisla United (west)
 2007 Hearts Azzurri (east) & Hamilton Serbians (west)
 2008 GS United (east) & PCC Supersonics (west)
 2009 GS United (east) & Croatia Hamilton (west)
 2010 GS United PE (east) & Caledon FC (west)

 2011 GS United PE (east) & PCC Missisauga (west)
 2012 Ulster Thistle
 2013 Caledon FC
 2014 Caledon FC
 2015 PCC Missisauga

 2016 Caledon FC
 2017 Durham Celtic
 2018 GS United
 2019 Woodbridge Strikers
 2021 Hungaria Vasas (east) & Hrvat St. Catharines (west)

External links
OSL (Official website)
Ontario Federation (Official website)

References

Soccer leagues in Ontario